Frisco Lil is a 1942 American drama film directed by Erle C. Kenton and written by George Bricker and Michael Jacoby. The film stars Irene Hervey, Kent Taylor, Minor Watson, Jerome Cowan, Samuel S. Hinds and Milburn Stone. The film was released on March 13, 1942, by Universal Pictures.

Plot
Law student Lillian Grayson has to interrupt her studies when her casino operating father gets accused of murdering someone. In order to clear his name she goes undercover as dealer in a gambling casino so she can get the information she needs.

Cast        
Irene Hervey as Lillian Grayson / Frisco Lil
Kent Taylor as Peter Brewster
Minor Watson as Jeff Gray
Jerome Cowan as Vince Warren
Samuel S. Hinds as James Brewster
Milburn Stone as Mike
Matty Fain as Garrity
Claire Whitney as Nell Brewster
Emmett Lynn as J. B. Devers
Harry Strang as Red
Tony Paton as Artie
Selmer Jackson as McIntyre
Harry C. Bradley as Judge
Gus Glassmire as Herrington
Paul McVey as Cornell

References

External links
 

1942 films
American drama films
1942 drama films
Universal Pictures films
Films directed by Erle C. Kenton
American black-and-white films
1940s English-language films
1940s American films